The 59th Street station was a local station on the demolished IRT Third Avenue Line in Manhattan, New York City. It was built on September 16, 1878. The local trains used two tracks and two side platforms. The center track was built as part of the Dual Contracts and was used for express trains. Due to its location along the east side of the headquarters for Bloomingdale's, the station was also known as "Bloomingdale's Station." The station was also the first rapid transit stop in the city to have an escalator, installed in September 1901. This station closed on May 12, 1955, with the ending of all service on the Third Avenue El south of 149th Street.

References

 NYCSubway.org 3rd Avenue El
 StationReporter.net Third Avenue Local

IRT Third Avenue Line stations
Railway stations in the United States opened in 1878
Railway stations closed in 1955
1878 establishments in New York (state)
1955 disestablishments in New York (state)
Former elevated and subway stations in Manhattan

Third Avenue
59th Street (Manhattan)